Asagena medialis is a species of cobweb spider in the family Theridiidae. It is found in the United States and Mexico.

References

Theridiidae
Articles created by Qbugbot
Spiders described in 1898
Spiders of North America